HaMidrasha means "Seminary" or "Academy" in Hebrew.
It may refer to two specific academies:

Academies 
 HaMidrasha – Faculty of the Arts, an art academy in Israel
 HaMidrasha - the academy of the Mossad Israeli intelligence and operations agency

Television Series 
It may also refer to a Television series:
 Mossad 101 - an Israeli TV series dealing with the Mossad's academy, whose original name is "HaMidrasha"